Ruth Lorraine Young  FHEA is Professor of Archaeology at the University of Leicester.

Career
Young completed undergraduate, MPhIl, and PhD studies at the University of Bradford. She was first appointed at the University of Leicester in 2000. She is a specialist in the archaeology of South Asia and the Middle East. She was elected as a Fellow of the Society of Antiquaries of London on 1 January 2010.

Select publications
Young, R. 2019. Historical Archaeology and Heritage in the Middle East. London: Routledge.
Young, R. & Fazeli, H. 2018. "Landlord Villages of Iran as Examples of Political Economy and Materiality". Post-medieval Archaeology 52,1: 34-48.
Newson, P. & Young, R. 2017. Post-Conflict Archaeology and Cultural Heritage. Rebuilding Knowledge, Memory and community from War-Damaged Material Culture. London: Routledge.
Brooks. A. & Young, R. 2016. "Historical Archaeology and Heritage in the Middle East: A Preliminary Overview". Historical Archaeology 50(4):22–35.
Newson, P. & Young, R. 2015. "The archaeology of conflict damaged sites: Hosn Niha in the Biq’a Valley, Lebanon". Antiquity 89, 344: 449-463.
Coningham, R. & Young, R. 2015. The Archaeology of South Asia. From the Indus to Asoka, c.6500 BCE to 200 CE. Cambridge: Cambridge University Press.
Young, R. 2003. Agriculture and Pastoralism in the Late Bronze and Early Iron Age, North West Frontier Province, Pakistan. Oxford: BAR. S1124.

References

Living people
British women archaeologists
21st-century archaeologists
Fellows of the Society of Antiquaries of London
Fellows of the Higher Education Academy
Academics of the University of Leicester
Year of birth missing (living people)
Archaeologists of South Asia
Archaeologists of the Near East
Alumni of the University of Bradford